Canens may refer to:

 Canens (mythology), in Roman mythology, the personification of song, a nymph from Latium
 Canens, Haute-Garonne, a commune in France